Timbo Island or Tambo Island is an island in the Rokel River, Sierra Leone.

References

Reports from Committees, Volume 5

Islands of Sierra Leone